Mzali is an Arabic surname. Notable people with the surname include: 

 Fethia Mzali (1927–2018), Tunisian teacher and politician
 Mohammed Mzali (1925–2010), Tunisian politician
 Mohamed Salah Mzali (1896–1984), Tunisian educator, historian, and politician

Arabic-language surnames